{{Infobox Boxingmatch
|fight date    = May 3, 2014
|Fight Name    = The Moment
|image         = 
|location      = MGM Grand Garden Arena, Paradise, Nevada, U.S.
|titles        = WBA (Unified), WBC, and The Ring welterweight titles
|fighter1      = Floyd Mayweather Jr.
|nickname1     = Money
|record1       = 45–0 (26 KO)
|hometown1     = Las Vegas, Nevada, U.S.
|height1       = 5 ft 8 in
|weight1       = 146 lb
|style1        = Orthodox
|recognition1  =  WBC and The Ring welterweight championWBA (Super), WBC, and [[List of The Ring world champions#Junior middleweight |The Ring]] light middleweight championThe Ring No. 1 ranked pound-for-pound fighter5-division world champion
|fighter2      = Marcos Maidana
|nickname2     =  El Chino("The Chinaman")
|record2       = 35–3 (31 KO)
|hometown2     = Margarita, Santa Fe, Argentina
|height2       = 5 ft 7 in
|weight2 = 146+1/2 lb
|style2        = Orthodox
|recognition2  = WBA welterweight champion

|result        =  Mayweather Jr. wins via 12-round majority decision (114-114, 117-111, 116-112)
}}
Floyd Mayweather Jr. vs. Marcos Maidana, billed as The Moment'', was a boxing welterweight championship fight. It was held on May 3, 2014 in the MGM Grand Garden Arena at the MGM Grand Hotel & Casino in Las Vegas, Nevada, United States, and broadcast on Showtime PPV.

Mayweather won the fight in a highly contested 12-round fight via majority decision. Judge Michael Pernick scored the fight 114–114, a draw. Judge Dave Moretti had it 116–112, and Burt A. Clements scored it 117–111.

The two fought again later that year in Floyd Mayweather Jr. vs. Marcos Maidana II, where Mayweather won again.

Fight card

Reception
The fight was sold out, grossing  at the live gate, the fourth highest of any boxing event in Las Vegas. It sold an estimated 900,000 buys on pay-per-view, the year's highest-selling PPV up until May 2014, grossing an estimated $63million in pay-per-view revenue, bringing the event's total revenue 

to an estimated $million.

Fight purses
Guaranteed fight purses: Over $37million total (including most expensive undercard in pay-per-view history, as of May 2014)

Headline
Floyd Mayweather ($32,000,000) vs. Marcos Maidana ($1,500,000)

Undercard
Amir Khan ($1,500,000) vs. Luis Collazo ($300,000)
Adrien Broner ($500,000) vs. Carlos Molina  ($100,000)

References

External links
 Floyd Mayweather vs. Marcos Maidana Official Fight Card from BoxRec
 Floyd Mayweather vs. Marcos Maidana on Showtime
 Floyd Mayweather vs. Marcos Maidana  on BoxNation

Maidana
2014 in boxing
Boxing in Las Vegas
Boxing on Showtime
2014 in sports in Nevada
Golden Boy Promotions
May 2014 sports events in the United States
MGM Grand Garden Arena
Amir Khan (boxer)